Maureen Bradley is a Canadian film director, producer, screenwriter, media artist, professor, and curator. She has produced over fifty short films and her work has been recognized internationally. Through her work, she challenges traditional gender norms and opposes the heteronormativity that dominates the television and film industry. Her focus is to bring more nontraditional representations of sex, gender, and sexuality to the forefront of film. Her work predominantly features queer characters and themes, including her most recent work and first feature film, Two 4 One. Bradley currently works as an Associate Professor at the University of Victoria in the Writing Department.

Early life and education 
Bradley was born and raised in Montreal, Quebec. She grew up with a love of music and sound, and in her early years, she pursued this love as a bassist in the underground music scene in Montréal, in the band "Sons of the Desert". It wasn't until later on that she discovered her interest in editing, film, and media art. Since then, she has played an active role in the Canadian independent film community. Her work has been featured in major venues, including the New Gallery and the Museum of Modern Art.

Bradley attended Concordia University for Communications and Media Studies. Upon her relocation to Vancouver, she furthered her education at the University of British Columbia. There, she received a Master of Fine Arts degree in Film Production.

Career 
During her career as a Montréal-based bassist, Bradley first became interested in the media industry when she was awarded a VideoFACT production grant to create a music video. From there, she became an assistant professor of film production at the University of Regina. During her time in Regina, she became the Saskatchewan District Council of the Directors Guild of Canada's first female director in 2002. She then returned to British Columbia and became an associate professor at the University of Victoria's Writing Department, where she continues to teach film and video. Using a grant she received from the Canada Foundation for Innovation, Bradley brought the Hi-Def Story Incubator Lab to life at the University of Victoria.

Bradley has been active in the film community across Canada since 1988. Her work in the Canadian film scene has been focused on challenging typical gender norms and binaries. While directing and appearing in the series Road Movies in 1992, which reached an audience of fifteen million viewers, she became the first person to publicly come out on a network Canadian television series.

Bradley has contributed to various film associations within Canada, including Queer City Cinema, Video In, and the Independent Media Arts Alliance of Canada. She is also the former president of the Board of Directors of CineVic Society of Independent Filmmakers.

Two 4 One 
Her most notable work to date is her debut feature film, Two 4 One. The idea for the film was inspired when she and her partner were reading a guide for lesbians interested in pregnancy. It tells the story of transgender man, Adam, his ex-girlfriend Miriam, and how they both end up—half accidentally, half intentionally—pregnant. The film stars Canadian actors Gavin Crawford, Naomi Snieckus and Gabrielle Rose. Bradley has stated that she is working towards creating a broader representation of family planning in film, branching out from traditional heterosexual conception. Two 4 One has received a great deal of positive feedback, including favourable reviews from The National Post and The Globe and Mail.

Personal life
Bradley is an out lesbian. She resides in Victoria, British Columbia with her partner, Stacey Horton, and their daughter, Ruby.

Filmography

Additional works 
 Burning Down My House (2013)
 Waylaid (2013)
 Beyond the Pale (2010)
 Pants on Fire (2009)
 Gullible (2008)
 Self-storage (2006)
 sisyphus (2005)
 Stranded (2004)
 My Heart the Historian (2001)
 Birthday Suit Management: a 21C Homage to Lisa Steele (2001)
 Erased (1999)
 Go Dyke! Go! (1998)
 What I Remember (1998)
 Tainted: Christopher Lefler and the Queer Censorship Chill (1997)
 Forever (1997)
 HER (1996)
 Forever (1996)
 Reframing the Montreal Massacre: A Media Interrogation (1995)
 Losing It (1995)
 Not Like That (1994)
 The Weight of Women's Eyes (1994)
 Defiance (1993)
 Queer Across Canada (1993)
 She Thrills Me (1993)
 Road Movies (1992)
 Safe Sex is Hot Sex (1991)
 We're Here, We're Queer, We're Fabulous (1990)
 Briser lâisolement: le SIA et les femmes au Québec (1990)

Awards and nominations 
Bradley has received recognition for her work in the film industry in numerous film festivals. Her web series, Freshman's Wharf, received a Leo Award in 2011. Her short film, Pants on Fire, was featured at the Worldfest/Houston International Film Festival and received a Golden Remi Award for Short Film Directing. Bradley has also been recognized at the Philadelphia Gay and Lesbian Film Festival, Austin Gay and Lesbian Film Festival, Reelings Festival, Chicago, and the Santa Barbara Gay and Lesbian Film Festival.

Her latest film Two 4 One has received numerous awards and nominations. Bradley was personally nominated for three Leo Awards for this film, including Best Motion Picture, Best Direction in a Motion Picture, and Best Screenwriting in a Motion Picture. She was also nominated for two awards at the Vancouver International Film Festival. Lead actor Gavin Crawford received the ACTRA Award for Outstanding Performance by a Male Actor, and Gabrielle Rose won a Leo Award for Best Supporting Performance by a Female in a Motion Picture.

Additionally, artistic retrospectives based on Bradley's work have been created in cities across Canada. These retrospectives include Making Scenes (1999) and Out on Screen (1998), hosted respectively by Ottawa's Gay and Lesbian Film Festival and Vancouver's Queer Film and Video Festival.

See also
 List of female film and television directors
 List of lesbian filmmakers
 List of LGBT-related films directed by women

References

External links 
 Official Website 
 

Living people
21st-century Canadian women writers
Canadian women film directors
Canadian women screenwriters
LGBT film directors
Canadian LGBT screenwriters
Film directors from Montreal
Writers from Montreal
Canadian lesbian writers
Concordia University alumni
University of British Columbia alumni
Academic staff of the University of Victoria
Year of birth missing (living people)
21st-century Canadian screenwriters
Lesbian screenwriters
21st-century Canadian LGBT people
Canadian lesbian artists